Djoueria Abdallah is a Comorian politician. A midwife from Mitsamiouli village. she also served as a member of the Assembly of the Union. She represented the first constituency of Ngazidja. As of 2007, she was still the only female member of the Assembly.

References

External links
 

Members of the Assembly of the Union of the Comoros
Comorian midwives
2004 in the Comoros
Year of birth missing (living people)
Living people
People from Grande Comore
21st-century Comorian women politicians
21st-century Comorian politicians